The 2019–20 Macedonian Third Football League was the 28th season of the third-tier football league in North Macedonia, since its establishment.

The season was interrupted on 12 March 2020 due to COVID-19 pandemic in North Macedonia, and was not continued. Veleshta, Rosoman 83 and Sloga 1934 were promoted to the Second League by the draw.

North

Table

Center

Table

Southeast

Table 
<noinclude>

West

Table

Southwest

Table

See also 
 2019–20 Macedonian Football Cup
 2019–20 Macedonian First Football League
 2019–20 Macedonian Second Football League

References 

Macedonian Third Football League seasons
North Macedonia 3
3